Scud Race is an arcade racing video game released by Sega in 1996. It is the first racing game to use the Sega Model 3 hardware. Despite being released well within the lifetime of the Sega Saturn, no Saturn port was ever released. A Dreamcast port was announced for the system's 1998 launch lineup and was shown as a tech-demo in the Dreamcast Presentation in 1998, but was cancelled.

Gameplay
Scud Race came in either Twin or Deluxe cabinets, which can be linked together for up to eight players. The game was modelled after the BPR Global GT Series, featuring the cars of four prominent teams in the 1996 season. The game features four different courses of varying difficulty, though two are beginner level (daytime and nighttime). Just like Daytona USA, an arcade operator can put the game in Grand Prix or Endurance Mode for longer races. There has never been a console release, although there was a tech demo of this game for the Dreamcast in the late 1990s (which may have turned into the Sega GT series).

The four Scud Race tracks are presented as an unlockable bonus in the Xbox version of OutRun 2, rearranged as a whole OutRun route instead of separate tracks with a number of laps each to race.

The opponent cars, aside from the selectable cars at the main screen, are all Renault Alpine GTA/A610s.

Development
After the success of Daytona USA, fans wanted a sequel. Director Toshihiro Nagoshi recounted: "The development team is the same, and so many believed that we would automatically be doing the sequel to Daytona. We wanted to change the team in order to ensure a different kind of game, but we never did. In the end, we need not have worried, because we've succeeded in producing something with a completely different look". Sega later had an arcade test game known as Supercar, but this evolved into Scud Race/Super GT. The most notable similarities include the HUD display with most features in the same positions on screen, and the handling style of the game. The main difference between gameplay is the addition of acceleration while drifting, which caused a radically different drifting strategy.

AM2 head Yu Suzuki, though not part of the Scud Race development team, gave advice on how to do the drift handling and the sound sampling. The cabinet design was by Sega AM4.

Scud Race was originally planned to be the first game to be released for the Model 3 arcade board, but marketing considerations led Sega to push it back to follow Virtua Fighter 3. During the test phase, key members of the development team raced the four cars depicted in the game in real life.

The game made its world debut on January 21, 1997, at the Amusement Trades Exhibition International show in London. Sega unveiled the official sequel to Daytona USA, Daytona USA 2, in 1998. Depending on what version of the game (Battle on The Edge or Power Edition) and cabinet the player is on (Single or 1–16), the three-four cars have different colors.

Release
Scud Race had a location test in early 1997 at the Sega City arcade in Irvine, California, before being released throughout North America. The game was released as Super GT in North America because in the U.S. the word "scud" evoked memories of the Scud missiles used by Iraqi forces in the then-recent Gulf War.

Scud Race Plus

Sega also created Scud Race Plus as an update to the game in 1997. This version allowed players to play any of the four courses in reverse. Scud Race Plus also included the bizarre "Super-Beginner" course, an oval track inside a giant-scale children's playhouse. This featured a rocking horse and bowling pins which the player could hit. Exclusive to this course, players could press Start at the car select screen to race as a cat, a tank, an "AM2 crew" bus or a rocket car. There is also an attract mode, which is not in the game, in which a red sports car runs in an Italian village and destroys the Roman Colosseum. The background with the giant wheel is actually blue rather than yellow-orange. There was no American release of Scud Race Plus. Apparently, Sega never marketed this version outside Japan, but it is possible to switch the country to "USA" and get "Sega Super GT Plus" which features everything from Scud Race Plus, but in the American format.

Reception
In Japan, Game Machine listed Scud Race on their March 1, 1997 issue as being the second most-successful dedicated arcade game of the month.

The game received positive reviews. The game was reviewed by Hyper magazine and rated 5 out of 5 stars. Next Generation rated it four stars out of five, and stated that "Sega's newest Model 3 creation is the most gorgeous driving game ever to grace an arcade.  Simply put, Sega Super GT is a visual masterpiece, boasting never-before-seen graphics and providing realistic driving speeds gamers simply have never ever experienced (unless, of course, they're Mario Andretti)".

Reviews
 All Game Guide (1998)

References

Notes

1996 video games
Arcade video games
Arcade-only video games
BPR Global GT Series
Cancelled Dreamcast games
Head-to-head arcade video games
Racing video games
Sega arcade games
Sega-AM2 games
Video games developed in Japan
Video games set in California
Video games set in Canada
Video games set in Italy
Video games set in Japan